Claude Anelka (born 12 March 1968) is a French football manager, who is currently the Director of Coaching at Little Haiti FC, and former player.

Early life
Anelka was born in Saint-Pierre, Martinique on 12 March 1968.

Playing career
Anelka played as a defender for Versailles, Paris FC and Choisy-le-Roi.

Managerial career 
In 2004, he invested approximately £300,000 into Scottish side Raith Rovers and became manager. However, he resigned as manager in September 2004 after managing just one draw and seven defeats from eight games. After resigning as manager, he became Director of Football, but resigned from that position in October 2004.

Anelka, after leaving Raith, worked as a coach at FC Trappes, where both his brother and Patrick Vieira began their careers.

On 8 December 2009, Anelka was announced as the first Head Coach of NASL expansion side AC St. Louis. Anelka was fired from the position on 25 June 2010.

After a spell as Head Coach of Floridians FC he was appointed Director of Coaching at Little Haiti FC, of the Florida Youth Soccer Association (FYSA) in February 2015.

Personal life 
He is the older brother of professional footballer Nicolas Anelka and acted as his agent in 1999.

References 

1968 births
Living people
French people of Martiniquais descent
French footballers
FC Versailles 78 players
Paris FC players
Association football defenders
French football managers
Association football agents
Raith Rovers F.C. managers
AC St. Louis coaches
Expatriate football managers in Scotland
Scottish Football League managers
French expatriate football managers
Expatriate soccer managers in the United States
French expatriate sportspeople in Scotland
French expatriate sportspeople in the United States
People from Le Chesnay
Footballers from Yvelines
AS Choisy-le-Roi players
Association football coaches